Wyoming Highway 321 (WYO 321) is a  north–south Wyoming State Road that is partially known as TY Basin Road and 1st Street and was once part of the Old Yellowstone Highway. WYO 321 travels from the junction with I-25/US 87/WYO 211, meets Wyoming Highway 313, and heads north to I-25/US 87 at exit 57 just north of Chugwater (Ty Basin Interchange). Wyoming Highway 321 was originally U.S. Highway 87, and its interchanges with I-25 are signed as I-25 Business.

Route description
WYO 321 begins at a diamond interchange with concurrent highways I-25 and US 87 on the south side of Chugwater. The highway passes the Chugwater rest area and turns north at TY Basin Road, After passing its junction with WYO 313, it heads out of town, paralleling I-25 until its northern terminus at exit 57.

Major intersections

References

Official 2003 State Highway Map of Wyoming

External links 

Wyoming State Routes 300-399

Transportation in Platte County, Wyoming
321
U.S. Route 87